Ramnagar (Kumaoni: Rāmnagar) is a town and municipal board in the Nainital district of Kumaon, India.

Ramnagar is a gateway to the Corbett National Park, the oldest national park and a famous tourist destination. The Garjiya Devi Temple and Sitabani temple, Sitabani Wildlife Reserve located nearby also attract many visitors.

Uttarakhand Board of School Education is headquartered in Ramnagar. The board was set up in 2001, and is responsible for administering courses of instructions, textbooks, and to conduct examinations for secondary school students of the state.

Geography 
Ramnagar is located at 29.40°N 79.12°E.

It has an average elevation of roughly 345 metres (1,132 feet). Ramnagar is located at the foothills of the Himalayas on the bank of river Kosi. The town is visited by many tourists due to its geographical location near Corbett National Park. Its proximity to Nainital which is a famous hill station of Northern India makes it even more popular. There is a Barrage on Kosi River in Ramnagar where many migratory birds such as  Ruddy Shelduck  arrive in winter.

History
The town is named after British commissioner Sir Henry Ramsay who established it in 1850 during the British rule in India During the British rule tea gardens were developed in Ramnagar and nearby villages in Uttarakhand. But these tea gardens have been closed for a long time. Ramnagar is most visited for Corbett National Park named after the hunter turned conservationist Jim Corbett who played a key role in its establishment. It is the oldest national park in India which was established in 1936. And ancient temples like Garjia Devi Temple and Sita Bani Temple both carry a lot of myths and legends behind them, which attracts a huge number of visitors every year.

Visitor attractions

Corbett National Park 

Corbett National Park is 10 km from Ramnagar. It is spread across 86 km north of Ramnagar. Established in 1936 as the Hailey National Park, Corbett National Park is the oldest and one of the most sought after national parks in India. It is India's first sanctuary to come under Project Tiger. The park was named after the hunter-naturalist turned author and photographer, Jim Corbett who lived in the region and contributed in setting up this park. Visitors can move about in vehicles (only local gypsies with the permit) inside the park area after making entries at the respective gates. Tourists now cannot drive their own cars inside Corbett. They have to hire gypsies with permits from Ramnagar. Permits are necessary for entering Corbett Tiger Reserve. Permits are issued at the CTR Reception Office in Ramnagar. Other places worth visiting in the region are the Crocodile Pool, Dhikala Machaan, Getheryo Library (Dhikala), Corbett Museum (Dhangadi gate), Corbett falls.

Garjiya Devi Temple

Garjiya Devi Temple is located in the Garjiya village near Ramnagar, Uttarakhand, India. It is a sacred Shakti shrine where Garjiya Devi is the presiding deity. The temple is situated over a large rock in the Kosi River and is one of the most famous temples of the Nainital district visited by thousands of devotees during Kartik Poornima, a Hindu holy day celebrated on the fifteenth lunar day of Kartik (November – December). It is also known as the festival of lights of the gods.[1] The Kartik Purnima festival also coincides with the Sikh festival of Guru Nanak Jayanti.

Sita Bani Temple

Sita Bani Temple is dedicated to Devi Sita, consort of Lord Rama. It is believed that she entered into the lap of Mother Earth here. Every year, a fair is held here during Ramanavami. It is located at a distance of 20 km from Ramnagar.

Tumaria Dam
The Tumaria Dam is located about 17 km from Ramnagar in Maldhan village on Kosi river bank and is a major tourist attraction.

Demographics 
Hinduism is the majority religion in Ramnagar with 55.91% followers [3]. Islam is second most popular religion in city with 42.92% following it. In Ramnagar, Christianity is followed by 0.35% and Sikhism by 0.73%.

Cuisine
The local Kumaoni food includes Bhatt ki Churkani, Jholi-Bhat, Gaahat ke Dubke, Channe ke Dubke, Ras-Bhat, Manduwe ki Roti, Paalak ka Kaapa, Bhang ki Chutni, singhodi, Aloo Ke Gutke, Thechwani, Bal Mithai, Singal, Bichoo Saag.

Accommodation
Ramnagar is also popular for having so many resorts for the tourists to accommodate. More than 100 resorts are located here.

Transportation

Air 
The nearest airport is Pantnagar Airport, 81.6 km away via UT SH 41 and 77.3 km away via NH 87 in the town of Pantnagar in Udham Singh Nagar district. However Indira Gandhi International Airport at Delhi is the nearest international airport which is 255  km away.

Another major airport from Ramnagar is Bareilly Airport which is located around 145km and connected to cities like Mumbai, New Delhi and Bengaluru.

Rail 
In 1907, during the British Raj the railway line in Uttarakhand was extended from Moradabad to Ramnagar. Ramnagar railway station is under the administrative control of the Izzatnagar division of the North Eastern Railway zone of the Indian Railways. The station is located about 65 km from Nainital. It has direct rail links to Kashipur, Moradabad, Delhi, Bareilly, Lucknow, Haridwar, Chandigarh, Gurgaon, Mumbai, Agra, Jaisalmer and Varanasi.Code of Ramnagar railway station is RMR

Road 

Ramnagar bus station is located near to the Railway station. There are regular buses from Ramnagar to Nainital, Ranikhet, Haldwani, Tanakpur, Haridwar , Dehradun, Kashipur, Moradabad , Meerut and Delhi. Bus services are also available to Jaipur. National Highway 121 which starts from Kashipur and ends at Bubakhal, Uttarakhand passes through Ramnagar.

References

External links 
 Official website of Nainital district
Jim Corbett National Park official website for online booking and more
 https://www.bing.com/search?q=census+2011&cvid=b74c855d7a5f419ca9a6a79458dc69c5&FORM=ANAB01&PC=U531

Cities and towns in Nainital district
Tourism in Uttarakhand